Yusuf bin Ahmad al-Kawneyn (b. 10th century), popularly known as Aw Barkhadle ("Blessed Father") or Yusuf Al Kownayn, was a Muslim scholar and traveler. Based on reference to Yusuf Al Kawneyn in the Harar manuscripts, Dr. Enrico Cerulli.

Biography

Local Somali oral tradition and written Ethiopian history gives reason to believe Aw Barkhadle allegedly arrived from Arabia. However Arabian origin stories pertaining to ancestral saints such as Yusuf are regarded as a myth by scholars and an islamification of a prior pagan origin story that relates back to Waaq and ancestor worship. That now ties the Somali to the prophets clan (Quraysh). Religious synchronism where the old religion is adapted to reflect the hegemony of the new in that the ancestral home of the ancestors in Arabia, the headquarters of Islam.    Thus Yusuf has been affirmed to have 'exalted origins' through being related to the prophet.

Yusuf is described by some scholars as a native   and as a Somali   who studied in his city Zeila and later in Iraq.  As a result of his studies in Iraq, he was given the title of "Al Baghdadi" as well. He is also noted for having devised a Somali nomenclature for the Arabic vowels, this would eventually evolve into Wadaad's writing.

He is accredited in certain areas for the introduction of black-headed fat-tailed sheep also known as Berbera Blackhead.

Described by some as a Sharif, he has been described as "the most outstanding saint in Somaliland". Yusuf's son Muhia ad-Din Yusuf Aw-Barkhadle is listed as Emir of Harar in 1038AD.

The sheikh is also known for spreading the Islamic faith to Southeast Asia, after traveling there from Zeila. He is also known as being a member of the Somali 'Diwan al-awliya' (Famous Saints of Somali Origin).

In the Maldives, he is called Saint Abu Barakat al Barbari ("Blessed father of Barbari") and whose religious name was Shaykh Yusuf al Kawneyn. He is credited with spreading Islam in the islands, establishing the Hukuru Miskiiy Mosque, and converting the Maldivian population into Islam. Ibn Battuta states the Maldivian king was converted by Abu Al Barakat Al Berber ("blessed father"). The Shaykh reportedly converted the islands into Islam by convincing the local King, Sultan Mohammed Al Adil, after having subdued Ranna Maari, a demon coming from the sea.

Family and Ancestral legacy

Sheikh Yusuf Al Kawneyn is also associated with the Walashma dynasty of Ifat and Adal, which was a medieval Muslim dynasty in the Horn of Africa. It governed the Ifat and Adal Sultanates in what are parts of present-day Somaliland, Djibouti and eastern Ethiopia. Sheikh Yusuf is described by some historians as being the ancestor of this royal family.  He is also known as representing the spiritual legacy of the Ifat and Adal Sultanates.  Some historians trace Sheikh Yusuf Al Kawneyn to the Gadabursi clan, which primarily inhabits the horn of Africa.

Shrines

The sheikh has shrines dedicated to him in Sri Lanka, in the town of Aw Barkhadle, northeast Hargeisa in Somaliland, in a site called Qoranyale, near the town of Borama. and Harar.

According to C.J Cruttenden, the tomb of saint Aw Barkhadle, which is located to the southwest of Berbera, was used by the Isaaq clans to settle disputes and to swear oaths of alliances under a holy relic attributed to Bilal Ibn Rabah. The Eidagale historically acted as mediators.

When any grave question arises affecting the interests of the Isaakh tribe in general. On a paper yet carefully preserved in the tomb, and bearing the sign-manual of Belat [Bilal], the slave of one of the early khaleefehs, fresh oaths of lasting friendship and lasting alliances are made...In the season of 1846 this relic was brought to Berbera in charge of the Haber Gerhajis, and on it the rival tribes of Aial Ahmed and Aial Yunus swore to bury all animosity and live as brethren.

According to renowned Somali anthropologist I.M. Lewis in his book Saints and Somalis: Popular Islam in a Clan-based Society, the descendants of Sheikh Isaaq (the Isaaq clan) annually gather at the historic shrine of Saint Aw Barkhadle to pay respects in the form of siyaaro (localized pilgrimage with offerings). As Aw Bardhadle had no known descendants, the descendants of the Saint's friend and contemporary figure, Sheikh Isaaq, will remember Aw Barkhadle in his stead: 

Since, however, Aw Barkhadle’s precise connection with the rulers of Ifat is not widely known, he appears as an isolated figure, and in comparison with the million or so spears of the Isaaq lineage, a saint deprived of known issue. The striking difference between these two saints is explained in a popular legend, according to which, when Sheikh Isaaq and Aw Barkhadle met, the latter prophesied that Isaaq would be blessed by God with many children. He, however, would not have descendants, but Isaaq’s issue would pay him respect and siyaaro (voluntary offerings). So it is, one is told, that every year the Isaaq clansmen gather at Aw Barkhadle’s shrine to make offerings in his name.

Aw Barkhadle
Tradition states Barkhadle travelled extensively from Mogadishu to Berbera, Hargeisa and finally Harar where he allegedly stayed for 300 years of his 500 year life. Towards the end of his reign he built a mosque in Dogar. Before Al-Kowneyn's arrival into this town (now named after him) was called Dogor. The residents were not Muslim, but rather pagan, believing and taking part of a pre-Islamic Somaliland religion called Wagar. The Wagar itself is thought to be an anthropomorphic representation of a sacred feature or figure, indicating an indigenous non-Islamic religious fertility practice in Aw Barkhaadle. The word "wagar"/"Waĝa" (or "Waaq") denotes the Sky-God adhered to by many Cushitic people (including the Konso) in the Horn of Africa including the Somali in pre-Islamic times both before and during the practice of Christianity and Islam.

While completing his studies in Zayla, Al Kowneyn was told of a town in present-day Somaliland called Dogor, with an oppressive king called Bu‘ur Ba‘ayr. According to the legend, Bu‘ur Ba‘ayr married couples by sleeping with the bride during the first six nights of the marriage and engaged in acts of paganism and magic. Local people at Aw-Barkhadle attribute the conversion of locals to Islam, to the defeat by duel of the previous religious leader, Bu‘ur Ba‘ayr, by the Muslim newcomer Aw-Barkhadle, who heard of the oppressive nature of the king and wanted to stop him. The Saint showed the religious superiority of his beliefs in contrast to the local beliefs of Bu‘ur Ba‘ayr's followers, whom the former won over in great number.

Furthermore, the Aw-Barkhadle site is an important burial site of the Muslim rulers of Awdal.  Al-Kowneyn himself of the Walashma dynasty of the thirteenth and fourteenth centuries AD is buried in this town.

Sri Lankan Muslim settlement
Yusuf bin Ahmad al-Kawneyn is also credited with starting the first Sri Lankan Muslim settlement. It is located in western Sri Lanka and is named Berbereen (Beruwala) in honour and respect of the Shaykh.

See also
Islam in Somaliland
Sheikh Isaaq Bin Ahmed Bin Mohammed  – 12th century Islamic leader in the northwestern Somaliland area, and founder of the Isaaq clan
Abdirahman bin Isma'il al-Jabarti

Notes

References

</ref>

12th-century philosophers
Islamic philosophers
Somalian Muslims
12th-century jurists